is a railway station in Bungo-Ōno, Ōita Prefecture, Japan. It is operated by JR Kyushu and is on the Hōhi Main Line.

Lines

Layout 
The station consists of two side platforms serving two tracks with a siding. The station building is a modern wooden structure which is unstaffed and serves only as a waiting room with an automatic ticket vending machine. A ramp leads up to the station building from the forecourt but access to the opposite platform is by means of a footbridge.

Adjacent stations

History
The track was extended westwards in phases, with  opening as the new western terminus on 27 March 1921. On the same day, Sugao was opened as an intermediate station on the new track. On 2 December 1928, the entire track from Kumamoto through Sugao to Ōita was designated as the Hōhi Main Line. With the privatization of Japanese National Railways (JNR), the successor of JGR, on 1 April 1987, the station came under the control of JR Kyushu.

In September 2017, Typhoon Talim (Typhoon 18) damaged the Hōhi Main Line at several locations. Services between Aso and Nakahanda, including Sugao, were suspended and replaced by bus services. Normal rail services between Aso and Ōita were restored by 2 October 2017.

Passenger statistics
In fiscal 2015, there were a total of 69,416  boarding passengers, giving a daily average of 190 passengers.

See also
List of railway stations in Japan

References

External links
Sugao (JR Kyushu)

Railway stations in Ōita Prefecture
Railway stations in Japan opened in 1921
Bungo-ōno, Ōita